Carnegie Steel Company was a steel-producing company primarily created by Andrew Carnegie and several close associates to manage businesses at steel mills in the Pittsburgh, Pennsylvania area in the late 19th century. The company was formed in 1892 and was subsequently sold in 1901 in one of the largest business transactions of the early 20th century, to become the major component of U.S. Steel. The sale made Carnegie one of the richest men in history.

Creation
Carnegie began the construction of his first steel mill, the Edgar Thomson Steel Works, in 1872 at Braddock, Pennsylvania. The Thomson Steel Works began producing rails in 1874. By a combination of low wages, efficient technology infrastructure investment and an efficient organization, the mill produced cheap steel, which sold for a large profit in the growing markets of industrial development. Carnegie alone estimated that 40% was returned on the investment, i.e., a profit of $40,000 from a $100,000 investment in the mill.

The profits made by the Edgar Thomson Steel Works were substantial enough to let Carnegie and his partners, including Henry Clay Frick, his cousin George Lauder, and Henry Phipps Jr., buy other nearby steel mills. These included the Homestead Steel Works, which Carnegie acquired in 1883. The presence of the Allegheny, Monongahela, and Ohio rivers provided transport for the heavy materials used in steel production. Each plant was near to or alongside a river.

Carnegie agreed to Frick's subsequent proposal that the various plants and assets, including H. C. Frick & Company, be consolidated into a single company. This consolidation occurred on July 1, 1892, with the formation of the Carnegie Steel Company.

Operations
The company headquarters were located in the Carnegie Building, an early skyscraper in Downtown Pittsburgh. Built to show its use of steel in its construction, the building was fifteen stories high and was left uncovered for a full year.  The Carnegie Building was demolished in 1952. It was later rebuilt as a memorial in 2012.

Carnegie Steel made major technological innovations in the 1880s, especially the installation of the open hearth furnace system at Homestead in 1886. It now became possible to make steel suitable for structural beams and, with the advanced work of George Lauder in arms and armament, for armor plate for the US Navy and the militaries of other governments, which paid far higher prices for the premium product. In addition, the plant moved increasingly toward the continuous system of production. Carnegie installed vastly improved systems of material-handling, like overhead cranes, hoists, charging machines, and buggies. All of this greatly sped the process of steelmaking and allowed the production of far vaster quantities of steel. As the mills expanded, the labor force grew rapidly, especially less skilled workers. The more skilled union members reacted with the unsuccessful 1892 Homestead Strike along with demands for reduced working hours and against pay cuts. After the unsuccessful strike the company continued to expand and profits grew year on year, with the company having earned net profits of $21 million in 1899.

J&L Steel was the most important competitor to the Carnegie Steel Company (and later to U. S. Steel) in the vicinity of Pittsburgh.

Sale
Carnegie Steel Company was sold in 1901 to U.S. Steel, a newly formed organization set up by J. P. Morgan. It sold at roughly $492 million ($14.8 billion in 2019), of which $226 million went to Carnegie himself. U.S. Steel was a conglomerate with subsidiary companies. The name of the subsidiary company was changed to the Carnegie-Illinois Steel Company in 1936.

20th-century steel production

Changes in production processes to create steel had already appeared before the Carnegie Steel Company was sold. Steel manufacturers had begun to abandon the Bessemer converters and install open-hearth furnaces. Open-hearth furnaces were widely employed until the 1980s, when basic oxygen steelmaking, the electric arc furnace and continuous casting made them obsolete. The Edgar Thomson Steel Works in Braddock is still active, producing steel slabs that are shipped upriver to the Irvin Works in West Mifflin to become finished coils.

See also
 History of the steel industry (1850–1970)
 Illinois Steel Company

References

Further reading
 A standard scholarly biography, along with Nasaw and Wall.

 Major biography along with Krass and Wall.

 A standard biography along with Nasaw and Krass.

External links

Carnegie Steel Company Records, Detre Library & Archives, Heinz History Center. 

Andrew Carnegie
Steel companies of the United States
Metals monopolies
Lauder Greenway Family
Defunct manufacturing companies based in Pittsburgh
Manufacturing companies established in 1892
Manufacturing companies disestablished in 1901
1892 establishments in Pennsylvania
1901 disestablishments in Pennsylvania
U.S. Steel
1901 mergers and acquisitions